The 1st Eastern Provincial Council was a meeting of the Eastern Provincial Council, with the membership determined by the results of the 2008 provincial council election held on 10 May 2008. The council met for the first time on 4 June 2008 and was dissolved prematurely on 27 June 2012.

Election

The 1st Eastern Provincial Council election was held on 10 May 2008. The United People's Freedom Alliance (UPFA), which was in power nationally, formed an alliance the Tamil Makkal Viduthalai Pulikal (TMVP) paramilitary group and won 20 of the 37 seats. The United National Party (UNP) formed an alliance the Sri Lanka Muslim Congress and won 15 seats. Smaller parties won the remaining 2 seats. The Tamil National Alliance (TNA), the largest party representing the Sri Lankan Tamils boycotted the election.

Results

The new provincial council met for the first time on 4 June 2008. Ajju  Mohamed Mohamed Faiz and M. K. D. S. Gunawardena were elected Chairman and Deputy Chairman respectively.

Government/Board of Ministers
S. Chandrakanthan, leader of the paramilitary Tamil Makkal Viduthalai Pulikal, was appointed Chief Minister by Governor Mohan Wijewickrama. Chandrakanthan was sworn in on 16 May 2008 in Colombo in front of President Mahinda Rajapaksa. The four government ministers appointed by the Governor with effect from 16 May 2008 were: M. L. Alim Mohammad Hisbullah (UPFA-ACMC); Thuraiyappa Navarathnaraja (UPFA-TMVP); Meera Sahibu Udumalebbe (UPFA-NC); and Dissanayaka Wimalaweera (UPFA-SLFP).

Minister M. L. Alim Mohammad Hisbullah (UPFA-ACMC) lost his seat on the council after being elected to Parliament. His ministerial replacement Muhamed Sharief Subair (UPFA-ACMC) was sworn in on 17 May 2010 in Trincomalee in front of the Governor.

According to article 154E of the Constitution of Sri Lanka the normal life of a provincial council is five years from the date of its first meeting. But using powers granted to him by article 154B(8)c Governor Mohan Wijewickrama dissolved the council prematurely on 27 June 2012, nearly a year ahead of schedule.

Deaths and resignations
The 1st Eastern Provincial Council saw the following deaths and resignations:
 8 July 2008: Rauff Hakeem (UNP-TRI) resigned to take a National List seat in the Parliament. His replacement was A. U. Razik Fareed.
 July 2008: Hasen Ali (UNP-AMP) resigned to take a National List seat in the Parliament. His replacement was Masoor Sinnalebbe.
 April 2010: M. S. Thowfeek (UNP-TRI) lost his seat after being elected to Parliament. His replacement was A. R. Mohamed.
 April 2010: M. L. Alim Mohammad Hisbullah (UPFA-BAT) lost his seat after being elected to Parliament. His replacement was K. L. M. Fareed.
 April 2010: M. K. D. S. Gunawardena (UPFA-TRI) lost his seat after being elected to Parliament. His replacement was N. G. Hewawitharana.
 April 2010: Basheer Segu Dawood (UNP-BAT) lost his seat after being elected to Parliament. His replacement was M. H. Sehu Ismail.
 15 April 2011: T. A. K. Thewarapperuma (UPFA-AMP) died. His replacement was D. R. S. Premarathna.

Members

References
 

2008 establishments in Sri Lanka
2012 disestablishments in Sri Lanka
Eastern Provincial Council